Viscount Sackville, of Drayton in the County of Northampton, was a title in the Peerage of Great Britain. It was created in 1782 for the soldier and politician Lord George Germain. He was made Baron Bolebrooke, in the County of Sussex, at the same time, also in the Peerage of Great Britain. Born Lord George Sackville, he was the third son of Lionel Sackville, 1st Duke of Dorset (see Duke of Dorset for earlier history of the family). He was succeeded by his son, the second Viscount. In 1815 he succeeded his cousin as fifth Duke of Dorset. All his titles became extinct on his death in 1843.

Viscounts Sackville (1782)
George Germain, 1st Viscount Sackville (1716–1785)
Charles Sackville-Germain, 2nd Viscount Sackville, 5th Duke of Dorset (1767–1843)

References

 *
Extinct viscountcies in the Peerage of Great Britain
Noble titles created in 1782